Piz Nadéls is a mountain of the Swiss Lepontine Alps, located south of Trun in the canton of Graubünden. It lies on the chain between the Val Sumvitg and Val Zavragia.

Its steep western face overlooks the Val Nadéls.

References

External links
 Piz Nadéls on Hikr

Mountains of the Alps
Mountains of Graubünden
Lepontine Alps
Mountains of Switzerland
Sumvitg